Velvet Assassin is a stealth video game developed by Replay Studios and published by SouthPeak Games. It was released for Microsoft Windows and Xbox 360 in 2009. Velvet Assassin's working title was Sabotage. It was released on the Mac app store in 2013. Players take control of Violette Summer, a World War II-era British Secret Intelligence Service spy operating deep behind enemy lines, attempting to help thwart the Nazi war effort. The game's story was inspired by a real-life secret agent/saboteur Violette Szabo.

Plot
Born in Dorset, Violette Summer (voiced by Melinda Y. Cohen) grew up in a happy family and had a great and active childhood. Initially, she started her working life in a beauty salon before the outbreak of war inspired her to move to London and join the weapon industry. It did not take too long for her to be noticed by the secret services, as she was beautiful, athletic and had great attention to detail, and so she was soon recruited into Secret Intelligence Service during Britain's darkest hours. Violette had lost an aunt during one of the first Luftwaffe bombing attacks and to further compound her heartache she later lost her Royal Air Force husband in battle. However, Summer was strong willed and used these painful experiences to inspire her to succeed as a spy for the SIS.

Summer managed to carry out several missions successfully before being gravely wounded by a sniper on a mission to kill Kamm, a Nazi military intelligence officer. Comatose in a hospital in France, Violette relives key moments in a series of flashbacks. Hence, the bulk of gameplay will take place during these flashbacks. The missions include blowing up a fuel depot on the Maginot Line, assassination of a colonel in a cathedral in Paris, stealing documents and marking a sub pen for bombers in Hamburg during Operation Gomorrah, and finding three secret agents in Warsaw. Moving through the city's sewer system, she finds one agent seriously wounded (and silences him) and another dead by cyanide poisoning, and a mission that involved moving through the Warsaw Ghetto, where the residents were either rounded up or executed, Violette makes her way through to the Gestapo's Pawiak prison to give cyanide to the third agent.

Through her memories, scenes from the hospital can be seen with two men arguing whether to keep Violette alive, give her up to the Schutzstaffel, or kill her to save her the torture if captured by the Nazis. Her location betrayed, Violette wakes from her coma to find the enemy troops entering the hospital. Escaping them, Violette finds the villagers being murdered or rounded up by a force from the Dirlewanger Brigade, a brutal SS unit of convicts, and taken to the church. Locking the villagers in, the soldiers set fire to the church. Violette is unsuccessful at trying to free the villagers, and due to emotional and physical exhaustion, collapses. The enemy leader is shown to be Kamm, whose face was burned by Violette's assassination attempt. In the end credits, Violette is shown in her hospital gown standing on a cliff overlooking a German plane.

Gameplay
When the game begins, Violette is seen from above, lying in a hospital bed. There are morphine syringes scattered across her bed, and the influx of drugs in her system creates a series of dreams that let her recount her past missions. Players have to hide in the shadows in order to avoid being detected. As a stealth-based game, lighting plays an important role. The HUD provides players with a silhouette of Violette which can be in one of three states. Purple means she is hidden in the shadows and invisible to enemies. White means she is exposed in light, but not yet detected. Red means she has been spotted and enemies are seeking out her position. If she is detected, she will either have to fight off the guard or escape.

The game employs a special lifeline if detected called "Morphine Mode". When triggered, Violette is shown in her hospital gown with blood drops appearing all over the screen. For a limited amount of time, Violette can execute any alerted guards or escape. Players have limited use of the morphine lifeline. The game also occasionally makes use of "Blend Stealth". If Violette acquires a female SS uniform, she can change her attire at predefined points in the game. When Violette wears the SS uniform, guards will not identify her as a threat unless she moves too close to them, or she performs a suspicious action, such as aiming a gun.

Violette's ability as an agent can be upgraded by finding a range of collectibles scattered throughout her environment. Once the player reaches 1,000 experience points, her skills can be upgraded in one of three ways: either Improved Stealth (sneaking), Morphine or Strength. The player can upgrade her skills based on individual gameplay style.

Promotion
SouthPeak Games worked with animator Peter Chung to produce a limited edition digital graphic novel based on the game. The novel was exclusively distributed to gamers who preordered the game from GameStop. 

Violette's Dream was an interactive experience produced to promote Velvet Assassin. Created by Yomi Ayeni and produced by Expanding Universe, a UK-based production company, the ARG mobilised thousands of participants on a real-life adventure as they searched for hidden treasure and real gold bars stamped with Nazi insignia. Using websites, forums, blogs, video, audio, mobile and telephone messaging, as well as performance and real-life events, the immersive and interactive story engaged players as they interacted with a variety of characters and organisations. One gold bar was found in a lock-up in Fredericksburg, Texas, the other at London Victoria station.

Reception

Velvet Assassin received "mixed" reviews on both platforms according to the review aggregation website Metacritic.

IGN cited inconsistent stealth mechanics and a weak story. GameSpot review, however, disagreed (criticizing instead the game's poor AI and "lousy gunplay") and called it "a powerful, unnerving look at one of history's darkest periods". GameZone praised the style and story of the game but disliked the predictability of the enemies.  In Japan, where the Xbox 360 version was ported and published by Ubisoft on September 17, 2009, Famitsu gave it a score of two sevens, one eight, and one six for a total of 28 out of 40.

References

2009 video games
MacOS games
Single-player video games
SouthPeak Games
Spy video games
Stealth video games
Video games about Nazi Germany
Video games developed in Germany
Video games featuring female protagonists
Video games set in France
Video games set in Germany
Video games set in Paris
Video games set in Poland
Video games using PhysX
Windows games
World War II video games
Xbox 360 games